The 2016–17 Albany Great Danes women's basketball team represents the University at Albany, SUNY during the 2016–17 NCAA Division I women's basketball season. The Great Danes, led by first year head coach Joanna Bernabei-McNamee, play their home games at SEFCU Arena and are members of the America East Conference. They finished the season 21–12, 12–4 in America East play to finish in second place. They defeated Vermont, Hartford and Maine to win America East Women's Tournament for the sixth straight year and they received an automatic bid of the NCAA women's tournament where they lost to Connecticut in the first round.

Media
All home games and conference road games will stream on either ESPN3 on AmericaEast.tv. Most road games will stream on the opponents website. Selected games will be broadcast on the radio on WCDB.

Roster

Schedule

|-
!colspan=12 style="background:#452663; color:#FFC726;"| Non-conference regular season

|-
!colspan=12 style="background:#452663; color:#FFC726;"| American East regular season

|-
!colspan=12 style="background:#452663; color:#FFC726;"| America East Women's Tournament

|-
!colspan=12 style="background:#452663; color:#FFC726;"| NCAA Women's Tournament

Rankings
2016–17 NCAA Division I women's basketball rankings

See also
 2016–17 Albany Great Danes men's basketball team

References

Albany
Albany Great Danes women's basketball seasons
Albany Great Danes
Albany Great Danes